The Belarusian railway bridge in Moscow is a three-span steel girder bridge over the Moscow River, located on the Belarusian suburban direction of Moscow Railway. It is the outcome of a structure built in 1895, which was renovated twice – in 1938 and 1961.

History 

A wooden single-track bridge on the Moscow-Brest railway line was originally built in this spot in 1871, but was replaced with a single-track steel structure in 1875, which had a double-span continuous deck-truss.

In 1895, a new double-track bridge was built. Two spans of the bridge were built with the use of the old truss, which was cut in half and strengthened in accordance with the building codes of 1884.

Renovation 

As such, the bridge had served prior to the construction of the Moscow Canal. The construction of the channel demanded to increase the dimensions of the bridge for the passage of river vessels. The project that involved a complete replacement of the bridge was rejected in favor of a more cost-effective way to renovate the existing bridge. So, in the mid-span, the deck-truss was replaced with another one of the through-type.

The double-track structure of 1938 has proved to be tenacious and it has served well thus far. The side spans that were established in the 19th century had many manufacturing defects and needed to be replaced in the 1950s. So, in 1961, they were replaced with new steel-reinforced concrete structures. The main criteria for selecting a project and technology was the time for disruption to traffic. The replacing of the four bridge's spans by the method of transverse advancing took no more than 16 hours of traffic disruption.

At present, the Belarusian rail bridge continues to operate, despite its respectable age.

References

Sources 
 

Railway bridges in Russia
Bridges in Moscow
Truss bridges
Railway lines in Russia